Conflict (or The Conflict) is 1921 American silent drama film directed by Stuart Paton and starring Priscilla Dean, Edward Connelly and Hector V. Sarno.

Plot summary

Cast
 Priscilla Dean as Dorcas Remalie
 Edward Connelly as John Remalie
 Hector V. Sarno as Buck Fallon 
 Martha Mattox as Miss Labo
 Olah Norman as Letty Piggott
 Herbert Rawlinson as Jevons
 Lee Shumway as Mark Sloane 
 Sam Allen as Orrin Lakin
 C.E. Anderson as Ovid Jenks
 Knute Erickson as Hannibal Ginger
 William Gillis as Hasdrubel Ginger
 Fred Kohler as Jevons' foreman

References

Bibliography
 Connelly, Robert B. The Silents: Silent Feature Films, 1910-36, Volume 40, Issue 2. December Press, 1998.
 Munden, Kenneth White. The American Film Institute Catalog of Motion Pictures Produced in the United States, Part 1. University of California Press, 1997.

External links
 
 
 
 

1921 films
1921 drama films
1920s English-language films
American silent feature films
Silent American drama films
Films directed by Stuart Paton
American black-and-white films
Universal Pictures films
1920s American films